The women's shot put event at the 1997 European Athletics U23 Championships was held in Turku, Finland, on 11 July 1997.

Medalists

Results

Final
11 July

Participation
According to an unofficial count, 12 athletes from 9 countries participated in the event.

 (1)
 (1)
 (2)
 (2)
 (1)
 (2)
 (1)
 (1)
 (1)

References

Shot put
Shot put at the European Athletics U23 Championships